Heike Friedrich (born 18 April 1970 in Karl-Marx-Stadt, Saxony) is a former freestyle swimmer from East Germany, who won two medals at the 1988 Summer Olympics in Seoul, South Korea.

At the age of 15, Friedrich won five gold medals in the 1985 European championships and won four more in the World Championship the next year. She had not lost in a single major international championship in any event until she was defeated by Janet Evans in the 400 m in the Seoul Olympics, taking the silver medal. Friedrich had already won the gold medal in the 200 m freestyle on the previous day.

In October 1986, she was awarded a Star of People's Friendship in gold (second class) for her sporting success.

References

External links
 
 
 
 

1970 births
Living people
East German female freestyle swimmers
Olympic swimmers of East Germany
Olympic gold medalists for East Germany
Olympic silver medalists for East Germany
Olympic gold medalists in swimming
Olympic silver medalists in swimming
Swimmers at the 1988 Summer Olympics
Medalists at the 1988 Summer Olympics
World record setters in swimming
World Aquatics Championships medalists in swimming
European Aquatics Championships medalists in swimming
Recipients of the Patriotic Order of Merit
Sportspeople from Chemnitz